Peter Pietras (April 21, 1908 – April 1993) was a U.S. soccer player who was a member of the U.S. national team at the 1934 FIFA World Cup and the 1936 Summer Olympics.  He also played five seasons in the American Soccer League. He was an accomplished amateur golfer in the later part of his life.

Professional career
Pietras began his professional career with the Philadelphia German-Americans of the American Soccer League in 1933.  He spent five seasons with Philadelphia, winning the 1935 league title and the 1936 National Challenge Cup championship.  He retired from playing professionally in 1938.

National and Olympic teams
In 1934, Pietras earned two caps with the U.S. national team.  His first game was a U.S. victory over Mexico, 4-2, in a World Cup qualifier.  His second was the lone U.S. game at the 1934 FIFA World Cup.  In that game, the U.S. lost to Italy in the first round of the cup.

In 1936, Pietras was selected for the U.S. soccer team which competed at the 1936 Summer Olympics.  The U.S. lost 1-0 to Italy and was eliminated in the first round.

References

External links
 1934 Roster with hometowns
 Roster with birth dates
 National Soccer Hall of Fame eligibility bio

1908 births
1993 deaths
American Soccer League (1933–1983) players
1934 FIFA World Cup players
Footballers at the 1936 Summer Olympics
Olympic soccer players of the United States
Uhrik Truckers players
United States men's international soccer players
Soccer players from Trenton, New Jersey
Association football midfielders
American soccer players